, also known as simply Bismark, is a Japanese anime television series created by Studio Pierrot.

The series aired on Nippon TV and its affiliates from October 7, 1984 to September 25, 1985, totaling 51 episodes. In 1986, the rights to Bismark were sold to the United States company World Events Productions (WEP). WEP reorganized and rewrote the series, incorporating most of the original episodes and creating six new ones before releasing it under the name Saber Rider and the Star Sheriffs.

Plot
In the year 2069, humanity begins to terraform and colonize the Solar System. In order to protect the colonies and maintain law and order in the solar system, the Earth Federation Government (EFG) was created. Soon, many settlers started to resent the EFG and its sphere of influence, straining the relationship between the central government and the colonies.

While a strained peace was being forged between Earth and the colonies, a race of non-human creatures known as Deathcula invaded the System in 2084. Without provocation, they attacked the colonies and killed many of the colonists. The EFG quickly realized that the Deathcula were technologically superior and their forces were hopelessly outmatched. In order to have a chance at survival, Dr. Charles Louvre developed a transformable starship known as the Bismarck.

Knowing that an advanced team of specialists were required to operate the Bismarck, four individuals came together and were charged with keeping the outer colonies safe from further Deathcula attacks.

Characters

Bismarck Team

At 17 years old, Shinji Hikari is the Japanese team leader. A motoracing driver, Shinji is optimistic, full of energy, and is more than a little hot-headed and impulsive (the classic Anime hero). Because of his flying abilities, he follows his father's footsteps in becoming a military pilot. But a problem with authority leads to Shinji's dismissal. He takes up racing, and eventually becomes the youngest champion of all time. Personally, Shinji is less successful with women, becoming nervous whenever they are around. This does not prevent him from eventually becoming romantically involved with Marianne Louvre, as they have known each other since childhood. Since his father left him when he was young, Shinji always wants to learn more about him that he approaches General Domes, his father's former comrade.

Richard Lancelot is an 18-year-old Scottish agent assigned to the Bismarck team by the English Royalty's special intelligence division. He is generally depicted as being a gentleman with a cool head for tactics and decisions. Richard is an expert with both swords and horses, and is described as "legendary" for his skills and marksmanship. Having great pride in his Scottish heritage, Richard is also proficient at playing the bagpipes, and yearns to return home to his girlfriend, Sincia.

Bill Willcox is a famous 16-year-old American jet pilot and sharpshooter, and holds an almost infallible accuracy with firearms. When his parents were killed by the Deathcula, Bill devoted his life to avenging them, and this feeling continues even after becoming part of the Bismarck team. The jokester of the group, Bill is a friendly and disarming charmer, and somewhat of a loner. He is also an outrageous flirt, making mostly unsuccessful passes at nearly every woman he meets.

Marianne Louvre is the 15-year-old daughter of Professor Charles Louvre, is of French nationality and is the engineer who led the construction of the Bismarck. A computer genius, Marianne was the chief envoy from the colonies to Earth. When the Deathcula attack, she calls on the colonies to join the EFG. During this meeting between the colony leaders, Marianne is chosen to join the Bismarck team, much to the pleasure of her father. Marianne is very technically minded, and most often helps her teammates from her station aboard the Bismarck. A brave girl, she's normally quite repulsed with the idea of killing anyone, even Deathcula. Marianne and Shinji have known each other since childhood, and soon become romantically involved.

Professor Charles Louvre is a scientist on Ganymede, and the father of Marianne Louvre. A well-respected politician, he founded the Bismarck Team during the second Deathcula attack in order to fight the Deathcula, and decided to use the most powerful arm of the EFG, the Bismarck robot, to defend the area around Ganymede. Louvre personally chooses Shinji Hikari as team leader.

General Domes is the ruler of the Eastern part of Ganymede and a former comrade of Shinji's father. Shinji often approaches him to learn more about his father, to which Domes refuses to say every time.

Deathcula
 are aliens who, after destroying their own planet in an internal war, transferred onto the planet Metheus. Unfortunately, this planet was also dying, so the Deathcula chose to leave it and conquer the Solar System. Their technology is quite advanced, and their society is one of discipline and obedience. Physically Deathcula look and act like humans, except that they have pointed ears and canine teeth. Due to this similarity, Deathcula are easily able to infiltrate and imitate humans.

Hyuza is the leader of the Deathcula, and is a tall, frightening cyborg with a demonic death mask for a face. Hyuza lost his body in the battle of Saturn 15 years ago, when Shinji's father destroyed his spacecraft. He transferred his brain in the main computer of Hell’s Paradise, and then connected it to a mechanical body, becoming a cyborg. Cold and cunning, Hyuza wishes revenge toward humans so badly that he chooses as one of his plans the idea to smash Hell’s Paradise into Earth, even if this means killing himself and his people as well. Thankfully, the Bismarck team stops this and destroys Hell's Paradise, killing both him and Perios and ending his reign of terror once and for all. His most trusted commanders are Perios and Gustav, but nevertheless Hyuza keeps them under tight control.

Perios is called from Andromeda by Hyuza himself, becoming Hyuza's most trusted subordinate. Perios is a cold, self-centered strategist, is a great pilot and sharpshooter, and is good at manipulating others. He is extremely ambitious, fears no one and is overly tenacious. During the war, Perios become Bill's most dangerous rival. He is eventually killed alongside Hyuza when the Bismarck team destroys Hell's Paradise.

Zatola wears a grotesque helmet, and as one of the main rivals of the Bismarck Team is the commander who orchestrates the Ganymede invasion. He receives legions of soldiers for battle, and his directives come from Hyuza himself. On occasion he can be seen infiltrating the human colonies. He seems to fear Hyuza, but is also quite loyal to him. He perishes after a duel with Shinji on Ganymede while the Bismarck is destroying his base.

An aide of Hyuza and Perios' former superior. He sees through Perios' plans and tries to warn the other Deathcula generals to no avail.

Songs
 Opening theme  by MIO

 Ending theme  by MIO

Adaptation 

When purchased by WEP in 1986, the studio reorganized and rewrote the series, and incorporated six newly written and animated episodes into the original Bismarck story before releasing it in 1987 under the name Saber Rider and the Star Sheriffs. Saber Rider ran for 52 episodes between 1987 and 1988.

In Saber Rider, the majority of the action is moved out of the solar system and into the rest of the galaxy. As opposed to a private group of four, the characters were written to be a small portion of a major military enforcement group known as the Star Sheriffs. Scenes of the main characters relaxing at a night club or bar and drinking alcohol were explained as "visiting a soda shop". Also, since showing death on American cartoons was much less accepted at that time, the Outriders were shown to "jump" back to their own dimension when defeated.
 
Shinji's name was changed to Fireball, a professional race car driver who had a crush on April Eagle (Marianne). Richard's name was changed to the titular Saber Rider, who was now the leader of the group. Bill became Colt and was part of a traveling rodeo until tragedy struck, after which he joined the Star Sheriffs. Marianne Louvre was renamed April Eagle, and became a former tennis pro whose three love interests were Saber Rider, Jesse Blue, and Fireball. Professor Charles Louvre was renamed Commander Eagle, and was the leader of Cavalry Command and the Star Sheriffs.

The Deathcula became The Outriders. In the new storyline, the Outriders were humanoids who come from another dimension called the Vapor Zone. They wanted to conquer mankind and control the universe unhindered, thinking the human dimension has much more to offer than their own. When an Outrider was shot or wounded, they did not die, but rather performed a "dimension jump", a process where they vanished and returned to their home dimension to reform.

Hyuza was given the name Nemesis, and his story was altered so that he was the evil genius in charge of the renegade Outriders and the mastermind behind their insidious schemes. Perios became Jesse Blue, a promising cadet at Cavalry Command until he fell in love with April Eagle during a training exercise. When April rejected his advances, he turned against the Star Sheriffs and cultivated a personal grudge against Saber Rider, ultimately becoming a fugitive, and joining forces with the Outriders. Zatola was known as Gattler.

The American animation used for the extra six episodes of Saber Rider was visibly different from the Japanese animation. Though the basic character designs remained the same, the style was vastly different from the original character art by Shigeru Kato. These new episodes were made to help enforce the changes made to the series, such as enforcing the "Western" theme with Cowboys and Indians, expanding on the Cavalry Command military structure, as well as showing visual evidence of Outriders reforming in their home dimension.

Episodes

References

External links 
Bismark 
Bismark 

Saber Rider und die Starsheriffs (German)

1984 anime television series debuts
1985 Japanese television series endings
1980s science fiction television series
1980s Western (genre) television series
Television series set in the 2080s
Japanese science fiction television series
Nippon TV original programming
Pierrot (company)
Super robot anime and manga
Space Western anime and manga
Space Western television series